China National Botanical Garden station, formerly known as Botanical Garden station, is a station on Xijiao line (light rail) of the Beijing Subway. It was opened on 30 December 2017. On April 18, 2022, following the renaming of China National Botanical Garden, the station was renamed to current name.

Station Layout 
The station has 2 at-grade side platforms.

See also 
China National Botanical Garden

References 

Beijing Subway stations in Haidian District
Railway stations in China opened in 2017